A zilā or zilla or zillah or jela  or jilha is a country subdivision in Bangladesh, India, Nepal and Pakistan. It is translated as district.

Zilas in Bangladesh

Zilas in India

Zilas of Nepal

Zilas in Pakistan

See also
Zila Parishad (disambiguation)
Districts of British India

References 

Types of administrative division